Intipucá is a small municipality in the southwestern La Unión department of El Salvador.

Etymology
Intipucá is a cognate of the Intibucá department of neighboring Honduras and is an alternate spelling of the same term in the Lenca language.  However, due to historical events, the indigenous peoples and their languages are neither recognized nor self identified in El Salvador.

References

Municipalities of the La Unión Department